W Connection Football Club is a football club from Trinidad and Tobago, which currently plays in the TT Pro League. The club plays its home games at the Manny Ramjohn Stadium in Marabella. The club's offices are based at the Point Lisas Industrial Estate in Trinidad and Tobago and sponsors the Wanderers Cricket Club, formerly sponsored by Caroni Limited.

History
The team was founded as W Connection Sports Club in 1986, as a "fete match" team, by brothers David John Williams and Patrick John Williams in San Fernando. Upon the creation of the TT Pro League, W Connection FC was officially founded in 1999, and promptly joined the nascent league. In 1999, their first season, the club finished third in the league, while winning the FA Trophy. Even though the club had a successful first season, the team would see even better times the next two campaigns, by winning the league in consecutive seasons.

The Savonetta Boys have also had success in domestic cups. W Connection have won the First Citizens Cup six years in the cup's nine-year existence. On September 26, 2008, in an exciting final of the cup, against Joe Public, W Connection used penalty kicks to claim the victory 6–5, after the match ended level 2–2, to claim their fifth consecutive title.

Club honours

League honours
TT Pro League
 Champions (5): 2000, 2001, 2005, 2011–12, 2013–14
 Big Six Winners (1): 2007

Cups and trophies
FA Trophy
 Winners (4): 1999, 2000, 2002, 2013–14
 Runners-up (3): 2003, 2008, 2009

First Citizens Cup
 Winners (6): 2001, 2004, 2005, 2006, 2007, 2008
 Runners-up (2): 2002, 2003

Digicel Charity Shield
 Winners (3): 2012, 2013, 2014

TOYOTA Classic: 2
 Winners (3): 2005, 2011, 2013

Digicel Pro Bowl
 Winners (6): 2001, 2002, 2004, 2007, 2013, 2014
 Runners-up (3): 2005, 2006, 2011

Lucozade Sport Goal Shield
 Winners (2): 2009, 2013
 Runners-up (1): 2014

International honours
CFU Club Championship
 Winners (3): 2002, 2006, 2009
 Runners-up (5): 2000, 2001, 2003, 2012, 2015

Record

Year-by-year

†W Connection finished second in the Championship Group of the CFU Club Championship 2000.
‡<small>Defence Force, winner of Group B, are considered the winner of the CFU Club Championship 2001 based on tie-breakers over W Connection.</small>
*W Connection, winner of Group B, are considered the winner of the CFU Club Championship 2002 based on tie-breakers over Arnett Gardens.
**W Connection, winner of Group A, are considered runners-up as they finished with fewer points than Valencia FC.

International competition
2000 CFU Club Championship
Group Stage v.  Tivoli Gardens – 1:1
Group Stage v.  Café Sisserou Strikers – 11:0
Group Stage v.  Empire – 3:3
Championship Group v.  Harbour View – 3:1
Championship Group v.  Carioca – 1:1
Championship Group v.  Joe Public – 0:1

2001 CFU Club Championship
First Round v.  Conquerors – 2:1, 8:0 (W Connection advances 10:1 on aggregate)
Group Stage v.  Jong Colombia – 3:1
Group Stage v.  RCH – 4:0

2002 CONCACAF Champions' Cup
First Round v.  Kansas City Wizards – 0:1, 0:2 (Kansas City Wizards advances 3:0 on aggregate)

2002 CFU Club Championship
Group Stage v.  Harbour View – 2:1
Group Stage v.  US Robert – 2:0

2003 CONCACAF Champions' Cup
First Round v.  Toluca – 3:3, 2:3 (Toluca advances 6:5 on aggregate)

2003 CFU Club Championship
First Round v.  FCS Nacional – 3:0, 0:2 (W Connection advances 3:2 on aggregate)
Semi-finals v.  Portmore United – 0:0, 1:0 (W Connection advances 1:0 on aggregate)
Final v.  San Juan Jabloteh – 1:2, 1:2 (San Juan Jabloteh wins 4:2 on penalties)

2006 CFU Club Championship
Group Stage v.  Hoppers – 5:0
Group Stage v.  Puerto Rico Islanders – 1:0
Semi-finals v.  Harbour View – 3:2
Final v.  San Juan Jabloteh – 1:0

2007 CONCACAF Champions' Cup
Quarter-finals v.  Guadalajara – 2:1, 0:3 (CD Guadalajara advances 4:2 on aggregate)

2009 CFU Club Championship
First Round v.  Bath Estate – 5:0, 12:1 (W Connection advances 17:1 on aggregate)
Second Round v.  Cavaly – 3:1, 1:0 (W Connection advances 4:1 on aggregate)
Semi-finals v.  San Juan Jabloteh – 2:1
Final v.  Puerto Rico Islanders – 2:1

2009–10 CONCACAF Champions League
Preliminary Round v.  New York Red Bulls – 2:2, 2:1 (W Connection advances 4:3 on aggregate)
Group Stage v.  Comunicaciones – 1:2, 3:0
Group Stage v.  UNAM – 2:2, 1:2
Group Stage v.  Real España – 0:1, 3:2

2012–13 CONCACAF Champions League
Group Stage v.  Xelajú – 2:2, 2:3
Group Stage v.  Guadalajara – 0:4, 1:1

2013–14 CONCACAF Champions League
Group Stage v.  Árabe Unido – 1:3, 0:2
Group Stage v.  Houston Dynamo – 0:0, 0:2

2015–16 CONCACAF Champions League
Group Stage v.  Santos Laguna – 0:4, 0:1
Group Stage v.  Saprissa – 0:4, 2:1

2016–17 CONCACAF Champions League
 TBD

Current squad
Squad for the 2019-20 TT Pro League

Staff

Technical staffTechnical Director/Head Coach:  Stuart Charles FevrierAssistant Coach:	
  Earl Jean 	Assistant Coach:	
  Eligah JosephGoalkeeper Coach:  Trevor Nottingham

ManagementPresident/Chief Executive Officer:	
  Renee John-Williams 	  	Chairman of the Board:''	
  David Martin

Youth
The youth teams of the club are member of the OASIS Youth League.

References

External links
Profile on Soca Warriors Online

 
Football clubs in Trinidad and Tobago
1999 establishments in Trinidad and Tobago
Association football clubs established in 1999